The Men's synchronized 3 metre springboard competition at the 2019 World Aquatics Championships was held on 13 July 2019.

Results
The preliminary round was started at 10:00. The final was started at 20:45.

Green denotes finalists

References

Men's synchronized 3 metre springboard